Transcription factor TFIIIB component B″ homolog also known as TFIIIB150 is a protein that in humans is encoded by the BDP1 gene.

Function 

TFIIIB150 is a subunit of the TFIIIB transcription initiation complex, which recruits RNA polymerase III to target promoters in order to initiate transcription. The encoded protein localizes to concentrated aggregates in the nucleus, and is required for transcription from all three types of polymerase III promoters. It is phosphorylated by casein kinase 2 during mitosis, resulting in its release from chromatin and suppression of polymerase III transcription.

References

Further reading

External links